The Kingdom of Youth is a 1918 American silent comedy film directed by Clarence G. Badger and starring Madge Kennedy, Tom Moore and Marie De Wolfe. The film's sets were designed by the art director Hugo Ballin.

Cast
 Madge Kennedy as Ruth Betts
 Tom Moore as Jimmy Betts
 Marie De Wolfe as Mrs. Ella Rice
 Lee Baker as Count Henri Duval
 Jennie Dickerson as Aunt Sophronia

References

Bibliography
 Donald W. McCaffrey & Christopher P. Jacobs. Guide to the Silent Years of American Cinema. Greenwood Publishing, 1999.

External links
 

1918 films
1918 comedy films
1910s English-language films
American silent feature films
Silent American comedy films
American black-and-white films
Films directed by Clarence G. Badger
Goldwyn Pictures films
1910s American films